A desk pad or blotter is a table protector used when work such as painting or writing would otherwise damage the table or desk.

Description 
Typical sizes for desk pads are A3 (420 × 297 mm, 11.7 × 16.5 in) and A2 (594 × 420 mm, 16.5 × 23.4 in). Desk pads are very popular promotional products, usually branded with a logo, contact information and product or service information.

Desk pads are usually glued at the foot (bottom) of the pad to prevent the paper from curling. Many are glued to a grey backboard. They can contain from 10 to 100 sheets although 50 sheets is standard.

Cultural variation 
Different desk pads have specific uses, for example Chinese calligraphy uses a black velour desk pad since Chinese calligraphy is written using an ink brush. Westerners use simpler writing pads with disposable paper surfaces that can be used for writing, note taking, and scribbling, often these pads are pre-printed with calendar pages, however desk pads made of material (often leather) which serve to be written on and act as mouse pads are also common.

See also 
 Notebook
 Pencil board

References 

Office equipment
Stationery
Writing